The Czech Republic formerly had a large number of narrow-gauge railways.  Apart from the public lines listed below, there were many non-public industrial, forest and agricultural narrow-gauge systems; only a few of these are still running.

Current public lines
Obrataň–Jindřichův Hradec–Nová Bystřice; gauge , total length 79 km, 30 stations and stops, partly operated by steam locomotives, maximum permitted speed 50 km/h, privately owned by JHMD
Třemešná ve Slezsku–Osoblaha; gauge , total length 20 km, maximum permitted speed 40 km/h, infrastructure operator is Správa železniční dopravní cesty, regular passenger trains are operated by České dráhy
Liberec–Jablonec nad Nisou;  gauge, operated by trams

Abandoned public lines
 Frýdlant–Heřmanice; 1900–1976; gauge , used to be connected to Zittau–Reichenau line
 Moravský Beroun–Dvorce;  1898–1933; gauge  (cs)
 Most–Litvínov–Janov;  7 Aug 1901 – 24 Mar 1961; gauge , operated by trams
 Network of  gauge tram lines around Ostrava, Bohumín, Orlová and Karviná; 1902–1973 (last remaining line closed)

References